In the U.S. state of Utah, some state highways have been specifically designated to serve state parks and state institutions. The range of numbers from State Route 281 to State Route 320 has been used for this purpose since 1969.


State Route 281 

State Route 281 served Dixie College (now Utah Tech University) in St. George until 1991. It was created in 1935 as State Route 191, connecting SR-1 (US-91, now SR-34) to the college. The route was renumbered to State Route 181A in 1945, State Route 67 in 1962, and finally SR-281 in 1969.

State Route 282 

State Route 282 consists of three segments named Campus Center Drive, South Campus Drive, Mario Capecchi Drive, and North Campus Drive, totaling . The route connects the University of Utah in Salt Lake City with several points on its border: SR-186 (500 South) at Guardsman Way, University Street at 400 South, SR-186 (Foothill Boulevard) west of Wakara Way, and 100 South east of Wolcott Street. The university roads were added to the state highway system in 1935 as part of SR-186, and were split off as State Route 181A in 1962 and renumbered SR-282 in 1969. The segments along Wasatch Drive and Medical Drive North were taken off the state system in 1988 and given to the University of Utah.

State Route 283 

The route was created in 1939, numbered State Route 182A in 1945, and renumbered SR-283 in 1969. The connection between SR-55 and the campus was moved from 400 East to 300 East in 1978 as part of a realignment of SR-55. In 2001, it was given te the city of Price so they could close one block of 600 North.

State Route 284 

State Route 284 is a  five-segment route that serves Weber State University in Ogden. It consists of a three-quarters loop with two outlets onto SR-203 (Harrison Boulevard) and two more onto Taylor Avenue and Skyline Parkway. The route was created in 1940, numbered State Route 184A in 1945, and renumbered SR-284 in 1969.

State Route 285 

It formerly served the Utah School for the Deaf, but the land is now owned by the Ogden City School District. The road was added to the state highway system in 1935 as part of SR-182, and became SR-285 in 1969.

State Route 286 

State Route 286 is a two-segment  route that loops around the Ogden–Weber Technical College in Ogden, with a one-way pair spurring west to SR-235 (Washington Boulevard) near that route's south end. Exits to Monroe Boulevard and North Street are not part of SR-286. It was created in 1935 as State Route 183 and originally serviced the Utah State Industrial School. It was renumbered SR-286 in 1969, while the Industrial School closed in 1983 and was replaced by the current college in 1984.

State Route 287 

State Route 287 connects SR-140 (14600 South) with the Utah State Prison in Draper via Pony Express Road (the west-side frontage road of I-15) and Bitterbrush Lane. The route was created as State Route 187 in 1935, serving the old Sugar House Prison on SR-4 in Sugar House. In 1941 it was moved to the current location, and the route was renumbered SR-287 in 1969. I-15 was built over the former US-91 by 1971, at which time SR-287 was reconnected to the state highway system via the new frontage road and 14600 South. The portion on 14600 South became SR-140 in 1984.

State Route 288 

State Route 288 served the Utah State University in Logan until 2007. It was created in 1935 as State Route 188 and renumbered SR-288 in 1969.

State Route 289 

State Route 289 is a  rectangular route around Southern Utah University in Cedar City. It follows Center Street from the intersection of SR-130 (Main Street) and SR-14 west to 1150 West, south to 200 South, east to 300 West, and back north to Center Street. The route was created in 1935 as State Route 190 and renumbered SR-289 in 1969.

State Route 290 

The route was created in 1935 as State Route 189, changed from a spur to a loop in 1965, and renumbered SR-290 in 1969.

State Route 291 

It was created in 1935 as State Route 182, running along 20th Street from SR-1 (US-89) east to the former campus at Monroe Boulevard. In 1962 it was extended east to Harrison Boulevard (SR-39, now SR-203). State Route 183A was created in 1939 and numbered in 1945, running east on 7th Street from SR-1 to what was then the Utah State Tuberculosis Sanatorium on the east side of Harrison Boulevard. This route was deleted in 1963 as a transfer for 12th Street, which was designated SR-205, but in 1968 the roads at the old sanitorium, then a new campus of the Schools for the Deaf and the Blind, were readded as part of SR-182. SR-182 was split between SR-285 and SR-291 in 1969, with the piece on 20th Street being removed from the state highway system.

State Route 292 

State Route 292 is a  four-part route that includes a perimeter road around the Salt Lake Community College's Redwood Campus in Taylorsville. There are three outlets onto SR-68 (Redwood Road) and one onto 2200 West.

State Route 293 

State Route 293 includes "all roads and parking areas" within the grounds of the Utah State Capitol in Salt Lake City. This includes access from SR-186 (Columbus Street). The roads on the capitol grounds were added to the state highway system in 1935 as part of SR-181, and were transferred to SR-184 in 1963 and split off as SR-293 in 1969.

State Route 294 

State Route 294 is a  route that serves the Utah State Hospital in Provo. It begins east of 900 East, where Center Street curves into Seven Peaks Boulevard, and ends in front of the administration building. The route was created in 1935 as State Route 184, connecting SR-1 (then on 700 East) with the hospital via Center Street. When SR-1 was moved in 1963, SR-184 became part of SR-114, which had followed Center Street west of SR-1 (500 West). Center Street east of 500 West, including the hospital roadways, was removed from the state highway system in 1964, but in 1969 the hospital portion was restored as SR-294.

State Route 295 

State Route 295 served the Utah Department of Public Safety's Orem Office until 2003. The route was created in 1982 but deleted in 2003, since the land had been sold and the office moved to a location with no driver's license test course.

State Route 296 

The route was created in 1935 as State Route 185, running east from SR-74 to the school, and extended east to SR-146 in 1941. The portion on the school grounds became SR-296 in 1969, while the rest was deleted.

State Route 297 

The route was created in 1969 and deleted in 1999, since the Utah Department of Transportation had not maintained the road for some time.

State Route 298 

State Route 298 consists of the driver's license test course at the Utah Department of Public Safety's Ogden Office. It is located in South Ogden on the southwest side of US-89 (Washington Boulevard), east of the Adams Avenue Parkway. The route was created in 1972.

State Route 299 

State Route 299 totals , and includes all the roadways at the Utah Department of Public Safety's West Valley City Office used for driver's license tests. This office is located at the northwest corner of 2700 West and 4700 South, across the former from the Rampton Complex (SR-317), in West Valley City.

State Route 300 

State Route 300 ran southwest from SR-18 in Snow Canyon State Park from 1972 until 1996, when it became part of SR-8.

State Route 301 

State Route 302 

State Route 303 

It was created in 1972.

State Route 304 

State Route 304 is a  route in Hyrum State Park, ending at the intersection of 300 South and 400 West in Hyrum. It was created in 1972, and was initially located farther southeast, at Center Street and 500 South; this is still where the route is defined in state law.

State Route 305 

State Route 305 served Big Sand Wash Reservoir (a former state park) until about 1989. However, between 1988 and 1990, "it was found there is no way to inventory said route", and it was deleted.

State Route 306 

State Route 307 

State Route 307 served Gunlock State Park until 1984. In 1984, the route was removed from the state highway system as a trade for the addition of SR-219 in Enterprise.

State Route 308 

State Route 308 served Kodachrome Basin State Park until 2003.

State Route 309 

It was created in 1972.

State Route 310 

It was created in 1972.

State Route 311 

It was created in 1972, mostly following an old alignment of US-40 that had been bypassed when the Starvation Reservoir was created.

State Route 312 

SR-312 was created in 1972.

State Route 313 

State Route 313 is a  route that connects US-191 northwest of Moab with the overlook in Dead Horse Point State Park. It was created in 1975 as a replacement for SR-278, which would have connected the park to SR-279.

State Route 314 

It was created in 1974.

State Route 315 

 
SR-315 was created in 1974.

State Route 316 

It was created in 1975.

State Route 317 

State Route 317 consists of the roads and parking lots of the Calvin L. Rampton Complex in West Valley City, which serves the Utah Department of Transportation and Department of Public Safety. It is located on the east side of 2700 West north of 4700 South, across the street from the DPS's West Valley City Office (SR-299).

State Route 318 

State Route 318 begins at SR-9 in Hurricane and runs north for  through Quail Creek State Park to Red Cliff Road, I-15's east side frontage road in Harrisburg (part of Hurricane). It can be driven from end to end without paying a park fee. It was created in 1992.

State Route 319 

It was created in 1989 as part of the realignments that were made when the Jordanelle Reservoir was created.

State Route 320 

It is located on the north side of 10400 North, just east of SR-68, northwest of Lehi. It was created in 1992 "to clarify maintenance responsibility" for the roads, particularly with respect to snow removal.

References

External links 

 Parks
State parks and institutions